Alois Wolfmüller  (24 April 1864 – 3 October 1948) was a German engineer and inventor.

Life 
Wolfmüller was born in Landsberg am Lech.  Together with Heinrich and Wilhelm Hildebrand he developed the Hildebrand & Wolfmüller motorcycle. Heinrich and Wilhelm Hidebrand were steam-engine engineers before they teamed up with Alois Wolfmüller to produce their internal combustion Motorrad in Munich in 1894.

Wolfmüller was a friend of German pioneer Otto Lilienthal and developed different kind of early flying objects.

He died, aged 84, in Oberstdorf.

External links 

 
  History of the company Hildebrand & Wolfmüller, Munich
  Duplicate of a "Hildebrand & Wolfmüller" in spring 2008

References 

19th-century German inventors
Engineers from Bavaria
Aviation pioneers
1864 births
1948 deaths